Donny Benét (born Ben Waples) is an Australian recording artist, based in Sydney. He is notable for his anachronistic musical style, borrowing heavily from 80s post-disco sounds. In 2011, he released his debut studio album Don't Hold Back through indie label Rice is Nice. His fifth studio album, Mr Experience, reached #26 on the ARIA Charts in May 2020.

Biography
Benét was born Ben Waples to a family of an Italian mother and a father who, like Benét, is also a musician. According to an NME interview in 2020, Ben Waples developed his Donny Benét persona when he watched an Italian accordionist perform to nursing homes. Prior to his solo career, he played double bass for jazz bands in Sydney.

Benét claims he was exposed to music from an early age as his father Antonio Giacomelli Benét was an Italian Disco accordionist and taught Donny to play the accordion and the electric bass. Benét played his first shows as an accordionist and synth player in Italian bands around Sydney until in the mid-2000s.

In 2010, Benét played in Jack Ladder's band The Dreamlanders and began recording his own songs in his studio Donnyland Studios. In 2011 he signed with Rice is Nice records and released Don't Hold Back, which was received with interest from Australian music media publications praising Benét's sincere take on 80's pop music.

In March 2020, Benét’s track "Konichiwa" was included on The Weeknd's 'Handpicked Playlist', which highlights 24 songs that inspired his album, After Hours.

In March 2020, Benét announced the release of his fifth studio album Mr. Experience as well as an accompanying tour of Europe and Australia. In April, many of these tour dates were postponed due to effects of the 2019–20 coronavirus pandemic.

Benét said Mr. Experience was inspired by the stylings of Bryan Ferry and Hiroshi Yoshimura, and in order to produce the record, he "envisioned the soundtrack to a dinner party set in the late 1980s". Mr.Experience was released on 22 May 2020 and debuted at number 26 on the ARIA Charts, becoming Benét's first release to reach the ARIA top 100.

In 2020, Benét's portrait, painted by Melbourne artist Tom Gerrard, was selected for the Salon des Refusés (Archibald).

In February 2022, Benét released his first new music in almost two years with the instrumental piece titled Le Piano and announced the release of his forthcoming EP, of the same name, released on 1 April 2022.

In October 2022, Benét announced a 2023 North American tour for Le Piano from 22 February to 18 March 2023

Influences and musical style

Benét's music mostly consists of synthesizers, but also features electronic drum machines, saxophone and electric bass, all of which (excluding saxophone) are played by Benét. Benét's influences includes Jan Hammer, Alan Vega, Prince, Eberhard Weber, Bernard Edwards, and Lou Reed, whom Benét credits as his inspiration to sing his own songs. The sexual nature of his lyrics arise from his experiences playing Tom Jones covers in the Airport Hilton Ballroom, Benét writing that he "had to sexualize his songs a lot more to keep (the audience) interested, make them a little bit more risqué, and I think that carried over to my own songs."

In a 2018 interview he explained, "I'm kind of always poking the piss at what a poor lover I am or you know, fictitiously what a great lover I could be." Benét was described by KEXP as "a fun, baffling mystery of a performer, one who you’ll find yourself falling in love with from his charisma alone" on the debut of the single "Second Dinner" in August 2019. Following the release of the single "Girl of My Dreams" in January 2020 during the North American Donny Benét Live tour, it was reviewed by Chicago Reader as a single that "is a tender ballad" and "Anchored by a wistful whistle, it has a relaxing feel that makes it perfect for catching your breath with a slow dance."

Discography

Studio albums

Extended Plays

Singles

Awards and nominations

AIR Awards
The Australian Independent Record Awards (commonly known informally as AIR Awards) is an annual awards night to recognise, promote and celebrate the success of Australia's Independent Music sector.

! 
|-
| AIR Awards of 2021
| Mr Experience
| Best Independent Pop Album or EP
| 
|

APRA Awards
The APRA Awards are presented annually from 1982 by the Australasian Performing Right Association (APRA).

! 
|-
| 2023
| "Le Piano"
| Song of the Year 
|  
| 
|-

ARIA Music Awards
The ARIA Music Awards is an annual awards ceremony that recognises excellence, innovation, and achievement across all genres of Australian music. Donny Benét had received 2 nominations.

|-
|rowspan="2"| 2020  
| Mr Experience 
| Best Adult Contemporary Album 
| 
|-
| Tim Rogers for Mr Experience  by Donny Benét
| Best Cover Art
| 
|-

National Live Music Awards
The National Live Music Awards (NLMAs) are a broad recognition of Australia's diverse live industry, celebrating the success of the Australian live scene. The awards commenced in 2016.

|-
| National Live Music Awards of 2016
| Himself
| Live Bassist of the Year
|

References

Living people
Australian male singers
Australian singers of Italian descent
Australian songwriters
1981 births
Australian accordionists